Wilbur H. Tousley (March 19, 1841 – December 8, 1903) was an American newspaper editor, printer, and politician.

Born in Wadsworth, Ohio, Tousley moved to Wisconsin in 1858 and then moved to Illinois in 1859. In 1860, he moved back to Wisconsin and then in 1861 moved back to Illinois. During the American Civil War, Tousley enlisted in the 69th Illinois Volunteer Infantry Regiment. He settled in Jefferson, Wisconsin and was the editor and publisher of the Jefferson Banner newspaper. In 1870, Tousley served in the Wisconsin State Assembly and was a Democrat. In 1879, Tousley moved to Chicago, Illinois; he died in Chicago, Illinois in 1903.

Notes

1841 births
1903 deaths
Politicians from Chicago
People from Wadsworth, Ohio
People from Jefferson, Wisconsin
People of Illinois in the American Civil War
Editors of Wisconsin newspapers
Democratic Party members of the Wisconsin State Assembly
Journalists from Ohio
19th-century American politicians